The women's water polo tournament at the 2015 World Aquatics Championships, organised by the FINA, was held in Kazan, Russia from 26 July to 7 August 2015.

Participating teams

Africa

Americas

Asia

Europe

Oceania

Format
The 16 teams were drawn into four groups of four teams and played a round-robin. The best placed team advances to the quarterfinal, while the second-and third best team advance to the playoffs. The last placed team will play in placement games for place 13–16. From the quarterfinals on, a knockout system will be used to determine the winner. The losers of the playoffs and quarterfinals will play in placement games to determine their final position.

Preliminary round

Group A
All times are MSK (UTC+3).

Group B
All times are MSK (UTC+3).

Group C
All times are MSK (UTC+3).

Group D
All times are MSK (UTC+3).

Knockout stage
Championship bracket

5th place bracket

9th place bracket

13th place bracket

Playoffs
All times are MSK (UTC+3).

Quarterfinals
All times are MSK (UTC+3).

13th–16th place classification
All times are MSK (UTC+3).

9th–12th place classification
All times are MSK (UTC+3).

5th–8th place classification
All times are MSK (UTC+3).

Semifinals
All times are MSK (UTC+3).

15th place match
All times are MSK (UTC+3).

13th place match
All times are MSK (UTC+3).

11th place match
All times are MSK (UTC+3).

9th place match
All times are MSK (UTC+3).

7th place match
All times are MSK (UTC+3).

5th place match
All times are MSK (UTC+3).

Bronze medal match
All times are MSK (UTC+3).

Gold medal match
All times are MSK (UTC+3).

Ranking and statistics

Final ranking

Team Roster
Sami Hill, Maddie Musselman, Melissa Seidemann, Rachel Fattal, Alys Williams, Maggie Steffens (C), Courtney Mathewson, Kiley Neushul, Ashley Grossman, Kaleigh Gilchrist, Makenzie Fischer, Kami Craig, Ashleigh Johnson. Head coach: Adam Krikorian.

Top goalscorers

Source: SportResult

Awards

Most Valuable Player
 Rachel Fattal

Best Goalscorer
 Rita Keszthelyi – 21 goals

Media All-Star Team
 Ashleigh Johnson – Goalkeeper
 Kami Craig – Centre forward
 Zoe Arancini
 Roberta Bianconi
 Rachel Fattal
 Rita Keszthelyi
 Maud Megens

References

External links
Official website
Records and statistics (reports by Omega)

2015
Women
2015 in Russian women's sport
2015 in women's water polo
Women's water polo in Russia